Denise Mina (born 21 August 1966) is a Scottish crime writer and playwright. She has written the Garnethill trilogy and another three novels featuring the character Patricia "Paddy" Meehan, a Glasgow journalist.  Described as an author of Tartan Noir, she has also dabbled in comic book writing, having written 13 issues of Hellblazer.

Mina's first Paddy Meehan novel, The Field of Blood (2005), was filmed for broadcast in 2011 by the BBC, starring  Jayd Johnson, Peter Capaldi and David Morrissey. The second, The Dead Hour, was filmed and broadcast in 2013.

Biography 
Denise Mina was born in East Kilbride in 1966. Her father worked as an engineer.  Because of his work, the family moved 21 times in 18 years: from Paris to The Hague, London, Scotland and Bergen; she has also professed an affection for Rutherglen, her mother's home town. Mina left school at 16 and worked in a variety of low-skilled jobs, including as a barmaid, kitchen porter and cook. She also worked for a time in a meat-processing factory. In her twenties she worked in auxiliary nursing for geriatric and terminal care patients, before returning to education and earning a law degree from Glasgow University.

It was while researching a PhD thesis on the ascription of mental illness to female offenders, and teaching criminology and criminal law at Strathclyde University in the 1990s, that she decided to write her first novel Garnethill, published in 1998 by Transworld.

Mina lives in Glasgow.

Awards and honours
1998 John Creasey Dagger for Best First Crime Novel, Garnethill
2011 The Martin Beck Award (Bästa till svenska översatta kriminalroman), The End of the Wasp Season
2012 Theakston's Old Peculier Crime Novel of the Year Award,  The End of the Wasp Season
2013 Theakston's Old Peculier Crime Novel of the Year Award, Gods and Beasts
2017 Gordon Burn Prize, The Long Drop
2017 McIlvanney Prize for Scottish Crime Novel of the Year, The Long Drop
2020 Deutscher Krimi Preis (Category: International crime writers) for Gods and Beasts

Bibliography

Novels
Garnethill trilogy
Garnethill (1998)
Exile (2000)
Resolution (2001)

Patricia "Paddy" Meehan novels
The Field of Blood (2005)
The Dead Hour (2006)
The Last Breath (2007) – published as Slip of the Knife in America

Alex Morrow novels
Still Midnight (2009)
The End of the Wasp Season (2010)
Gods and Beasts (2012)
The Red Road (2013)
 Blood, Salt, Water (2014)

Anna & Fin novels
Conviction (2019)
Confidence (2022)
 
Other novels
Sanctum (2003) (published as Deception in the US in 2004)
The Long Drop (2017) based on the 1958 trial and execution of the serial killer Peter Manuel.
The Less Dead (2020)
Rizzio (2021)

Comics
To date, the entirety of Mina's work in comics has been published under DC Comics' Vertigo imprint:
Hellblazer #216–228 (with Leonardo Manco and Cristiano Cucina (#223), 2006–2007) collected as John Constantine, Hellblazer Volume 19 (tpb, 328 pages, 2018)
Vertigo Crime: A Sickness in the Family (with Antonio Fuso, graphic novel, 192 pages, 2010)
The Millennium Trilogy graphic novel adaptations:
The Girl with the Dragon Tattoo (tpb, 312 pages, 2014) collects:
 The Girl with the Dragon Tattoo Book One (with Leonardo Manco and Andrea Mutti, hc, 152 pages, 2012)
 The Girl with the Dragon Tattoo Book Two (with Leonardo Manco and Andrea Mutti, hc, 160 pages, 2013)
The Girl Who Played with Fire (with Andrea Mutti, Leonardo Manco and Antonio Fuso, hc, 288 pages, 2014, ; sc, 2015)
The Girl Who Kicked the Hornet's Nest (with Andrea Mutti and Antonio Fuso, hc, 272 pages, 2015, ; sc, 2016)

Plays
Ida Tamson (2006)
A Drunk Woman Looks at the Thistle (2007), inspired by Hugh MacDiarmid's modernist poem, A Drunk Man Looks at the Thistle, and first performed by Karen Dunbar.
The Meek, radio play for BBC Radio 3, broadcast on 7 March 2009

Notes

External links

Still Midnight review and interview in The Scotsman
Denise Mina talking with Ian Rankin at the Edinburgh International Book Festival (transcript and audio), 17 August 2006
Amy Myers, End of the Wasp Season review in ShotsMag Ezine

1966 births
Living people
Scottish people of Irish descent
Scottish crime fiction writers
Scottish mystery writers
People from East Kilbride
Scottish women novelists
Scottish comics writers
Female comics writers
Barry Award winners
Alumni of the University of Strathclyde
Alumni of the University of Glasgow
20th-century Scottish novelists
21st-century Scottish novelists
20th-century Scottish women writers
21st-century Scottish women writers
Scottish dramatists and playwrights
Women mystery writers
British women dramatists and playwrights
Members of the Detection Club
Tartan Noir writers